Petro Kindratovych Korol (2 January 1941 – 2 July 2015) was a Ukrainian weightlifter and Olympic champion who competed for the Soviet Union.

Born in Lviv, he won a gold medal at the 1976 Summer Olympics in Montreal. Korol was a member of the Dynamo sports society.

References

External links
 Sadovnyk, O. Petro Korol: After my disqualification, the head of Dynamo regional council wanted to send me... for guard duty in labor camp. "Vysokyi Zamok". January 5, 2012.

1941 births
2015 deaths
Ukrainian male weightlifters
Soviet male weightlifters
Olympic weightlifters of the Soviet Union
Weightlifters at the 1976 Summer Olympics
Olympic gold medalists for the Soviet Union
Olympic medalists in weightlifting
Sportspeople from Lviv
Dynamo sports society athletes
Medalists at the 1976 Summer Olympics